The Women's 100m Backstroke event at the 10th FINA World Aquatics Championships swam on 21–22 July 2003 in Barcelona, Spain. Preliminary heats swam during the morning session on July 21, with the top-16 finishers advancing to Semifinals that evening. The top-8 finishers then advanced to swim again in the Final the next evening.

At the start of the event, the World (WR) and Championship (CR) records were:
WR: 59.58 swum by Natalie Coughlin (USA) on August 13, 2002 in Fort Lauderdale, USA.
CR: 1:00.16 swum by Cihong He (China) on September 10, 1994 in Rome, Italy

Results

Final

Seminfinals

Prelims

References

Swimming at the 2003 World Aquatics Championships
2003 in women's swimming